Carl William Preston (born 1991) is an English footballer. He started his career with AFC Bournemouth.

Preston made four first team appearances for AFC Bournemouth. His league debut came against Bury at Dean Court on 20 December 2008. In July 2009, Preston joined Conference South side Weymouth on a one-year contract. He left in August 2009 and signed for then Wessex League side Poole Town.

He went on trial at Reading from 03 - 6 May 2011. Although Carl has had many trials at different clubs he is still playing at Poole Town FC.

References

External links

1991 births
Living people
Sportspeople from Poole
Footballers from Dorset
Association football midfielders
English footballers
AFC Bournemouth players
Poole Town F.C. players
Weymouth F.C. players
English Football League players
National League (English football) players
Wessex Football League players